Transient receptor potential cation channel, subfamily M, member 7, also known as TRPM7, is a human gene encoding a protein of the same name.

Function 

TRPs, mammalian homologs of the Drosophila transient receptor potential (trp) protein, are ion channels that are thought to mediate capacitative calcium entry into the cell. TRP-PLIK is a protein that is both an ion channel and a kinase. As a channel, it conducts calcium and monovalent cations to depolarize cells and increase intracellular calcium. As a kinase, it is capable of phosphorylating itself and other substrates. The kinase activity is necessary for channel function, as shown by its dependence on intracellular ATP and by the kinase mutants.[supplied by OMIM]

Interactions 

TRPM7 has been shown to interact with PLCB1 and PLCB2.

Clinical relevance 

Defects in this gene have been associated with magnesium deficiency in human microvascular endothelial cells.

See also 
 TRPM

References

Further reading

External links 
 

Ion channels